Princess Alice may refer to:

People
 Princess Alice of the United Kingdom (1843–1878), third child and second daughter of Queen Victoria
 Princess Alice of Bourbon-Parma (1849–1935), daughter of Charles III, Duke of Parma and Princess Louise Marie Thérèse of France
 Princess Alice, Countess of Athlone (1883–1981), Princess Alice of Albany, granddaughter of Queen Victoria 
 Princess Alice of Battenberg (1885–1969), great-granddaughter of Queen Victoria; married into the royal house of Greece and known as Princess Andrew of Greece and Denmark; she was the mother of Prince Philip, Duke of Edinburgh
 Princess Alice, Duchess of Gloucester (1901–2004), wife of Prince Henry, Duke of Gloucester, third son of King George V and Queen Mary; née Lady Alice Christabel Montagu-Douglas-Scott
 Princess Alicia of Bourbon-Parma (1917–2017), daughter of Elias, Duke of Parma and Archduchess Maria Anna of Austria

Other
 SS Princess Alice, multiple ships with the name
 Princess Alice and the Broken Arrow, 2007 album from British melodic rock band Magnum
 Princess Alice Bank, a submerged seamount that is located in the Portuguese archipelago of the Azores